St. Stephen and the Incarnation is an Episcopal parish in the Mount Pleasant neighborhood of Washington, D.C.  It was formed by the merger of St. Stephen's parish and the Church of the Incarnation.  It is notable as the site of the second ordination of female priests in the Episcopal Church and the first public celebration of the Eucharist in the Episcopal Church by a female celebrant.

The church has also played a role in climate change activism. As Bill McKibben noted in his book Oil and Honey, activists used the church as a staging ground for protests related to the Keystone XL Pipeline.

References 

Episcopal churches in Washington, D.C.
Churches completed in 1929